BBC Radio Solent is the BBC's local radio station serving Hampshire, Dorset and the Isle of Wight.

It broadcasts on FM, DAB, digital TV and via BBC Sounds from studios on Havelock Road in Southampton.

According to RAJAR, the station has a weekly audience of 209,000 listeners and a 4.4% share as of December 2022.

Overview
The station, which began broadcasting on 31 December 1970, is named after the Solent, the area of sea between Southampton, Portsmouth and the Isle of Wight. 

In 1996, Radio Solent expanded its coverage into West Dorset and South Dorset by taking over neighbouring BBC Dorset FM, which was formerly an opt-out of BBC Radio Devon.

In 2013, a new programme targeted specifically for Dorset listeners on 103.8FM was launched under the name Breakfast in Dorset, after campaigns for a more locally focused service. The programme comes from a studio complex based in Dorchester and also broadcasts county-wide on DAB.

Transmitters 

The service is broadcast on 96.1 FM for Hampshire, the Isle of Wight and eastern Dorset from Rowridge transmitting station on the Isle of Wight; and on 103.8 FM for western Dorset from Bincombe Hill transmitter. Since 2003 the station has also been broadcast on DAB Digital Radio from the NOW South Hampshire and NOW Bournemouth networks from thirteen transmitters between them.

In addition, BBC Radio Solent also broadcasts on Freeview TV channels 722 (Hampshire / Isle of Wight) and 726 (Dorset) in the BBC South region and streams online via BBC Sounds.

From launch until 2020, BBC Radio Solent broadcast on Medium Wave with the main AM transmitter on 999 kHz from Fareham and covering most of the coverage area and a secondary transmitter covering Bournemouth and Poole on 1359 kHz from Fern Barrow, Bournemouth.

North and north-east Hampshire
The signal for Hampshire on 96.1 FM from Rowridge on the Isle of Wight is weaker audible north of Winchester than the transmissions from other BBC Local Radio stations, so that the north Hampshire town of Basingstoke is officially served by BBC Radio Berkshire, while towns such as Aldershot, Farnborough and Fleet in the north-east of the county are served by BBC Radio Surrey.

Programming
As of 2022, local programming is produced and broadcast from the BBC's Southampton studios from 6am – 1am each Monday-Saturday and from 6am - 6pm and 10pm - 1am on Sundays. These shows must contain at least 60% speech content within the core broadcast hours of 06.00-19.00, with full speech content during the breakfast peak of 07.00-08.30, with a minimum requirement of 95 hours of locally-made programme that provides news, information and content relevant to the areas and communities it serves.

The station's 06.00-10.00 breakfast show, 10.00-14.00 morning show and 14.00-18.00 afternoon show are broadcast solely to the Solent area. The station's late show, airing from 22.00-01.00, is additionally broadcast to other BBC Local Radio stations in the South (comprising BBC Radio Berkshire and BBC Radio Oxford) and South East (comprising BBC Radio Kent, BBC Radio Surrey and BBC Radio Sussex).

The station's Saturday and Sunday afternoon show is occupied by sports coverage under the BBC Radio Solent Sport banner. The Saturday evening Stereo Underground show with Richard Latto from 18.00-20.00 also airs on sister stations in the South, South East regions and the Channel Islands (BBC Radio Guernsey and BBC Radio Jersey) while the Sunday evening show with Tony Blackburn from 18.00-22.00 is broadcast across the South and South East but originates from BBC Radio Berkshire in Reading. The Saturday evening 20.00-22.00 slot is occupied by the BBC Music Introducing programme which features music from new and up and coming artists from the local area. The show helped discover and launch the careers of Wet Leg and has featured artists such as Natives and Echotape.

During the station's downtime, BBC Radio Solent simulcasts overnight programming from BBC Radio 5 Live between the hours of 01.00 and 05.00 and an early morning breakfast programme broadcast across the Local Radio network from BBC Radio London.

Presenters

Notable current presenters include:

Tony Blackburn (Sunday evenings)
Alex Dyke (Friday evenings, Saturday nights, Sunday nights)
Paul Miller (weekday nights)

Notable past presenters 

 Roger Day, DJ and presenter up to 2012, now at Boom Radio 
 Kenny Everett (presenter, 1972, died in 1995)
 Nicky Horne (presenter, left in 2019, now at Boom Radio)
 John Piper - (Broadcaster) (Presenter of Piper's Tune throughout the 1970s, left to launch 2CR in Bournemouth)
 Richard Skinner (broadcaster) (newsreader, left to join BBC Radio 1 in 1973)
 Peter White (broadcaster) (the BBC's Disability Affairs Correspondent, worked for Radio Solent from 1970 to 2006)
 Seán Street (broadcaster, poet, writer, and Britain's first Professor of Radio)
 Carolyn Quinn (now a BBC Radio 4 presenter)
 Sally Taylor (broadcaster, presenter of BBC One South's South Today. Worked for BBC Radio Solent 2006–2011)
 Andrew Peach (now at BBC Radio Berkshire)
 Simon Jupp  (now Member of Parliament for East Devon)

References

External links 
 
 Media UK - BBC Radio Solent

Radio stations established in 1970
Solent
Radio stations in Hampshire
Radio stations in the Isle of Wight
Radio stations in Dorset
Companies based in Hampshire
Southampton
1970 establishments in England